Tanju is a masculine Turkish given name.
It means blessed by God in old Turkish. It was used by Chinese as a reference to Turkic khans.

Tanju is equivalent to Tanhu, Shanyu, Chanyu.

It may refer to:

People
 Tanju Çolak, retired Turkish footballer
Tanju Gürsu, Turkish actor

See also
 Tanju, the art of pistol defense often learned in the martial art of jujutsu

Turkish masculine given names